Gheorghe Mititelu (born 30 October 1934), is a Romanian chess player.

Biography
From the late 1950s to the early 1970s Gheorghe Mititelu was one of the leading Romanian chess players. He was a multiple participant in the Romanian Chess Championships, where he achieved his best in 1974 when he finished 2nd.

Gheorghe Mititelu played for Romania in the Chess Olympiads:
 In 1960, at fourth board in the 14th Chess Olympiad in Leipzig (+6, =3, -7),
 In 1964, at first reserve board in the 16th Chess Olympiad in Tel Aviv (+1, =3, -2),
 In 1970, at first reserve board in the 19th Chess Olympiad in Siegen (+2, =4, -1).

Gheorghe Mititelu played for Romania in the European Team Chess Championship:
 In 1973, at sixt board in the 5th European Team Chess Championship in Bath (+1, =3, -2).

Gheorghe Mititelu played for Romania in the World Student Team Chess Championships:
 In 1957, at first board in the 4th World Student Team Chess Championship in Reykjavik (+1, =4, -5),
 In 1958, at first board in the 5th World Student Team Chess Championship in Varna (+2, =3, -2),
 In 1960, at first board in the 7th World Student Team Chess Championship in Leningrad (+3, =6, -3).

References

External links

Gheorghe Mititelu chess games at 365chess.com

1934 births
Living people
Romanian chess players
Chess Olympiad competitors